Ralf Büchner (born 31 August 1967) is a retired German gymnast. He competed at the 1988 and 1992 Summer Olympics and finished in second and fourth place with the East German team, respectively. His best individual achievement was ninth place in the vault in 1988. He won a gold and a bronze medal at the world championships in 1991, as well as four medals at the European championships in 1990, 1992 and 1994.

References

1967 births
Living people
Gymnasts from Berlin
German male artistic gymnasts
Olympic gymnasts of East Germany
Olympic gymnasts of Germany
Gymnasts at the 1988 Summer Olympics
Gymnasts at the 1992 Summer Olympics
Olympic silver medalists for East Germany
Olympic medalists in gymnastics
Medalists at the 1988 Summer Olympics
Medalists at the World Artistic Gymnastics Championships
20th-century German people
21st-century German people